Vindesine, also termed Eldisine, is a semisynthetic vinca alkaloid derived from the flowering plant Catharanthus roseus. Like the natural (e.g. vinblastine and vincristine) and semisynthetic vinca alkaloids (e.g. vinorelbine and vinflunine) derived from this plant, vindesine is an inhibitor of mitosis that is used as a chemotherapy drug. By inhibiting mitosis, vinedsine blocks the proliferation of cells, particularly the rapidly proliferation cells of certain types of cancer. It is used, generally in combination with other chemotherapeutic drugs, in the treatment of various malignancies such as leukaemia, lymphoma, melanoma, breast cancer, and lung cancer.

References 

Vinca alkaloids
Mitotic inhibitors